California's 30th congressional district is a congressional district in the U.S. state of California. The 30th district takes in the Linda Vista neighborhood of Pasadena, and the Los Angeles area communities of Tujunga, Burbank, Glendale, Hollywood, West Hollywood, Edendale, Park La Brea, Hancock Park, and westside Echo Park. The district is currently represented by Democrat Adam Schiff.

Competitiveness

In statewide races

Composition

As of the 2020 redistricting, California's 30th congressional district is located in Southern California. Two sections of the district are within Los Angeles County, and the other two sections cover parts of northern Los Angeles.

Los Angeles County is split between this district, the 27th district, the 28th district, the 29th district, the 32nd district, the 34th district, the 36th district, and the 37th district. The 30th and 27th are partitioned by Angeles National Forest, B P and L Rd, Mt Emma Rd, BPL Rd, Angeles Forest Highway, NF-3N17, Moody Canyon, NF-4N53, Soledad Canyon Rd, Indian Canyon Rd, and Santa Clarita Divide Rd.

The 30th and 28th are partitioned by Angeles National Forest, Big Tujunga Creek, Big Tujunga Canyon Rd, Silver Creek, Markridge Rd, Pennsylvania Ave, Northwoods Ln, Ramsdell Ave, Fairway Ave, La Crescenta Ave, Mayfield Ave, Rosemont Ave, Florencita Ave, Thompson Ct, Park Pl, Verdugo Blvd, La Tour Way, Descanso Gardens, Norham Pl, Wendover Rd, Linda Vista Ave, Oak Grove Dr, Yucca Ln, W Montana St, Vermont St, Forest Ave, Wyoming St, Lincoln Ave, Anderson Pl, Canada Pl, Highway 210, W Hammond St, Glen Ave, W Mountain St, Manzanita Ave, N Orange Grove Blvd, and Ventura Freeway.

The 30th and 29th are partitioned by Angeles National Forest, NF-4N35, Gold Creek Rd, Big Tujunga Canyon Rd, Little Tujunga Rd, Longford St, Clybourne Ave, Foothill Freeway, Kagel Canyon St, Osborne St, Terra Bella St, Glenoaks Blvd, Montague St, San Fernando Rd, Branford St, Tujunga Wash, Wentworth St, Sheldon St, Tuxford St, Sunland Blvd, Golden State Freeway, Cohasset St, Sherman Way, Vineland Ave, Southern Pacific Railroad, Ledge Ave, W Clark Ave, N Clybourn Ave, and the Los Angeles River.

The 30th and 32nd are partitioned by Lankershim Blvd, Fredonia Dr, Cahuenga Blvd W, Broadlawn Dr, Multiview Dr, Mulholland Dr, Laurel Canyon Blvd, W Sunset Blvd, Ozeta Ter, and Doheny Rd.

The 30th and 34th are partitioned by Crenshaw Blvd, Wilshire Blvd, S Van Ness Ave, S Wilton Pl, N Wilton Pl, Beverly Blvd, N Western Ave, Melrose Ave, Hollywood Freeway, Douglas St, Lilac Ter, N Boylston St, Academy Rd, Pasadena Freeway, Highway 5, Duvall St, Blake Ave, Fernleaf St, Crystal St, Blake Ave, Meadowvale Ave, Los Angeles, Benedict St, N Coolidge Ave, Glendale Freeway, Roswell St, Delay Dr, Fletcher Dr, Southern Pacific Railroad, S Glendale Ave, Vista Superba Dr, Verdugo Rd, Plumas St, Carr Park, Harvey Dr, and Eagle Rock Hilside Park.

The 30th, 36th, and 37th are partitioned by Phyllis Ave, N Doheny Dr, N Oakhurst Dr, Burton Way, N Robertson Blvd, 8733 Clifton Way-201 S Le Doux Rd, N San Vicente Blvd, La Cienga Park, W Olympic Blvd, San Vicente Blvd, S Cochran Ave, Edgewood Pl, S Cloverdale Ave, S La Brea Ave, and S Sycamore Ave.

Cities & CDP with 10,000 or more people
 Los Angeles - 3,898,747
 Glendale - 196,543
 Pasadena - 138,699
 Burbank - 107,337
 West Hollywood - 35,757

List of members representing the district

Election results

1952

1954

1956

1958

1960

1962

1964

1966

1968

1970

1972

1974

1976

1978

1980

1982 (Special)

1982

1984

1986

1988

1990

1992

1994

1996

1998

2000

2002

2004

2006

2008

2010

2012

2014

2016

2018

2020

Historical district boundaries
Before the 2013 redistricting resulting from the 2010 United States Census and the 2012 elections, the western Los Angeles County district was represented by Democrat Henry A. Waxman.  From 2003 to 2013 the district included many of the cities and suburbs of western Greater Los Angeles, most notably Hollywood, West Hollywood, Beverly Hills, Santa Monica, Pacific Palisades, Malibu and Topanga, Calabasas, Agoura Hills, Woodland Hills.

See also
List of United States congressional districts

References

External links
GovTrack.us: Map of California's 30th congressional district
GovTrack.us: Brad Sherman, U.S. Representative for California's 30th Congressional District
California Voter Foundation map: 30th Congressional District—CD30

30
Government of Los Angeles County, California
Government of Ventura County, California
San Fernando Valley
Simi Hills
Canoga Park, Los Angeles
Chatsworth, Los Angeles
Encino, Los Angeles
Granada Hills, Los Angeles
Hidden Hills, California
Hollywood Hills
Los Angeles River
Reseda, Los Angeles
Sherman Oaks, Los Angeles
Studio City, Los Angeles
Tarzana, Los Angeles
West Hills, Los Angeles
Winnetka, Los Angeles
Woodland Hills, Los Angeles
Constituencies established in 1953
1953 establishments in California